The concrete goose, also known as a porch goose or lawn goose, is a popular lawn ornament in the United States. Concrete geese reached the peak of their popularity in the 1980s, but are still common in the Midwestern United States. 

It is not uncommon for owners of concrete geese to dress them in costumes for seasonal holidays, to match the weather, or just as decoration.

References

Garden ornaments
Geese
Birds in popular culture
Novelty items
Culture of the Midwestern United States